David Luke (1921–2005) was a scholar of German literature at Christ Church, Oxford.

He was renowned for his translations of Johann Wolfgang von Goethe, Thomas Mann, Heinrich von Kleist, Eduard Mörike, Adalbert Stifter and the Brothers Grimm.

He won the European Poetry Translation Prize – subsequently renamed the Popescu Prize – in 1989 for his translation of Part I of Goethe's Faust. In 2000, the German-British Forum awarded him a medal of honour for his contributions to cultural relations between the UK and Germany.

According to one 2017 appraisal, Luke's translation of Goethe's Faust is said to "allow Goethe's complex and varied meanings to emerge, including his philosophic and religious skepticism" and is described as "being more open to the conflicts and contradictions, theological and secular, virtues and vices, and idealism and cynicism than many translations into English".

Luke described translation as being "the art of the least intolerable sacrifice ... the instinctive choice between competing imperfections".

His literary agent and others have commented that he was "famed for his love of playing Wagner at maximum volume". He was friends with W. H. Auden and Iris Murdoch.

Translations  
 1964 – Johann Wolfgang von Goethe, Selected Verse, Penguin
 1966 – Johann Wolfgang von Goethe, Conversations and Encounters, Oswald Wolff
 1968 – Adalbert Stifter, Limestone and Other Stories, Harcourt, Brace & World
 1968 – Adalbert Stifter, Cape Editions
 1977 – Johann Wolfgang von Goethe, Roman Elegies, Chatto & Windus
 1978 – Heinrich von Kleist, The Marquise of O, Penguin
 1982 – Jacob and Wilhelm Grimm, Selected Tales, Penguin
 1987 – Johann Wolfgang von Goethe, Faust, Part One, Oxford University Press
 1987 – Johann Wolfgang von Goethe, Hermann and Dorothea
 1988 – Thomas Mann, Death in Venice, Bantam Books
 1988 – Thomas Mann, The Road to the Churchyard
 1994 – Johann Wolfgang von Goethe, Faust, Part Two, Oxford World Classics
 1994 – Johann Wolfgang von Goethe, Erotic Poems, Oxford World Classics

References 

1921 births
2005 deaths
People associated with Christ Church, Oxford
Literary scholars
20th-century British translators
Translators of Johann Wolfgang von Goethe
Translators of Thomas Mann